Eugene Levy is a Canadian actor, writer and comedian. 

He received thirteen Primetime Emmy Award nominations winning four times, two for SCTV Network 90 and two for Schitt's Creek. He also received a Grammy Award, a Screen Actors Guild Award, and 11 Canadian Comedy Awards.

Major associations

Emmy Award

Golden Globe Award

Grammy Award

Independent Spirit Award

Guild awards

Producers Guild of America

Screen Actors Guild Award

Writers Guild of America

Canadian awards

ACTRA Awards

Canadian Comedy Awards

Gemini Awards

Critics awards

Miscellaneous awards

References

External links

Lists of awards received by American actor
Lists of awards received by American musician